Whitchurch station may refer to:
Whitchurch railway station (Wales)
Whitchurch railway station (Hampshire), in England
Whitchurch Town railway station, a former station on the Didcot, Newbury & Southampton line in Hampshire
Whitchurch railway station (Shropshire), in England
Whitchurch Halt, a former station on the Bristol and North Somerset Railway